Monroe County Library may refer to:

Monroe County Public Library in Monroe County, Indiana
The Monroe County Library branch of the Flint River Regional Library System